This is a list of recipients of the Distinguished Service Cross military decoration awarded to personnel of the Australian Defence Force. It is awarded for distinguished command and leadership in action. The DSC was introduced in 1991 and is the highest distinguished service decoration in the Australian Honours System. Recipients of the Distinguished Service Cross are entitled to use the post-nominal letters "DSC". Since its inception 87 awards have been made—which includes six Bars—with the most recent being announced in the 2018 Queen's Birthday Honour's List.

See also
 Australian Honours System

References